Clinidium simplex is a species of ground beetle in the subfamily Rhysodinae. It was described by Louis Alexandre Auguste Chevrolat in 1873.

References

Clinidium
Beetles described in 1873